The 1948–49 Copa del Generalísimo was the 47th staging of the Copa del Rey, the Spanish football cup competition.

The competition began on 5 September 1948 and concluded on 29 May 1949 with the final.

First round

Second round

Third round

|}

Fourth round

|}

Fifth round

|}

Round of 16

|}
Tiebreaker

|}

Quarter-finals

|}

Semi-finals

|}

Final

|}

References

External links
 rsssf.com
 linguasport.com

Copa del Rey seasons
1948–49 in Spanish football cups